Giovanni Pettinati (26 March 1926 – 25 April 1994) was an Italian racing cyclist. He won stage 8 of the 1954 Giro d'Italia.

References

External links
 

1926 births
1994 deaths
Italian male cyclists
Italian Giro d'Italia stage winners
Place of birth missing
Sportspeople from the Province of Alessandria
Cyclists from Piedmont